Árpád Szabó (born 4 October 1957) is a Romanian judoka. He competed in the men's extra-lightweight event at the 1980 Summer Olympics.

References

1957 births
Living people
Romanian male judoka
Olympic judoka of Romania
Judoka at the 1980 Summer Olympics
People from Reghin